Leon Müller (born 11 August 2000) is a German professional footballer who plays as a midfielder for FSV Frankfurt.

Career
Müller made his professional debut for Darmstadt 98 in the 2. Bundesliga on 28 June 2020, coming on as a substitute in the 90+1st minute for Tobias Kempe in the away match against VfB Stuttgart, which finished as a 3–1 win.

On 11 July 2022, Müller joined FSV Frankfurt in the fourth-tier Regionalliga Südwest.

References

External links
 
 
 
 

2000 births
Living people
German footballers
Association football midfielders
SV Darmstadt 98 players
FC Rot-Weiß Koblenz players
FSV Frankfurt players
2. Bundesliga players
Regionalliga players